Allactaea lithostrota is a species of crabs in the family Xanthidae, the only species in the genus Allactaea.

References

Xanthoidea
Monotypic crustacean genera